Leutenberg is a town in the district of Saalfeld-Rudolstadt, in Thuringia, Germany. It is situated in the Thuringian Forest, 18 km southeast of Saalfeld.

History
Within the German Empire (1871-1918), Leutenberg was part of the Principality of Schwarzburg-Rudolstadt.

References

Saalfeld-Rudolstadt
Schwarzburg-Rudolstadt